Wybalenna Island comprises four round granite islands with a combined area of about 16 ha, in south-eastern Australia.  It is part of Tasmania’s Prime Seal Island Group, lying in eastern Bass Strait west of Flinders in the Furneaux Group.  The island is a conservation area.

Fauna
Recorded breeding seabird and wader species are little penguin, short-tailed shearwater, white-faced storm-petrel, Pacific gull, silver gull, sooty oystercatcher and black-faced cormorant.  The metallic skink is present.

See also

 List of islands of Tasmania

References

Furneaux Group